The Zetland Magpies are an Australian semi-professional rugby league football team based in Zetland, New South Wales, a suburb of south-central Sydney they play in the South Sydney District Junior Rugby Football League.

Notable players
Darren Brown (1987-98 South Sydney Rabbitohs, Canterbury-Bankstown Bulldogs, Western Suburbs Magpies, Penrith Panthers, Salford Red Devils & Trafford Borough)  
Jim Serdaris (1989-96  South Sydney Rabbitohs, Manly Sea Eagles, Canterbury Bulldogs & Wests)
Craig Field (1990-01 South Sydney Rabbitohs, Manly Sea Eagles, Balmain & Wests)
Terry Hill (1990-05 South Sydney Rabbitohs, Sydney, Manly & West Tigers)
Jim Dymock (1991-04 Wests, London Broncos, Canterbury Bulldogs & Parramatta Eels)
Nick Zisti (1991-99 South Sydney Rabbitohs, St George Illawarra Dragons, Hunter Mariners, Cronulla & Bradford Bulls)
Anthony Mundine (1993-00 St George Dragons, Brisbane Broncos & St George Illawarra Dragons)
Lee Hookey (1999-06 South Sydney Rabbitohs, St George Illawarra Dragons & Penrith Panthers)

See also

References

External links
 

Rugby league teams in Sydney
Rugby clubs established in 1953
1953 establishments in Australia